Gorkha District, a part of Gandaki Province, is one of the 77 districts of Nepal, which is the fourth largest district (by area) of Nepal and connected historically with the creation of the modern Nepal and the name of the legendary Gorkha soldiers. Gorkha district is the site of the Manakamana Temple. The temples of Gorakh Nath and Gorakh Kali are found in the district. Several major rivers—the Chepe, Daraudi, Marsyangdi, Budi Gandaki, and Trishuli—run through the district.

Origin"Gorkha"

 Myth holds that a saint named Gorakhnath appeared for the first time in Nepal in Gorkha. There remains a cave with his paduka ('footprint') and a likeness which supports the myth. As the city was established in the place where Sage Gorakhnath appeared, it was named Gorkha.

Geography and climate

Mountains

 Manaslu (8,163 m)
 Himalchuli (7,895 m)
 Shringi Himal (7,177 m)
 Buddha Himal (6,674 m)
 Ganesh Himal (7,422 m)
 Ngadi Chuli (7,871 m)
 Nar Phu	 : Peri Range 5748 m
 Ganesh VI : Ganesh Himal range (6480 m)
 Tobsar Peak	: Shringi Himal range (6100m)

Transport
Gorkha town has daily bus services to and from Kathmandu (six hours) and Pokhara (three hours).

Demographics
At the time of the 2011 Nepal census, Gorkha District had a population of 271,061. Of these, 73.0% spoke Nepali, 13.4% Gurung, 4.7% Magar, 3.8% Tamang, 1.1% Ghale, 0.9% Urdu, 0.7% Newari, 0.6% Kumhali, 0.6% Chepang, 0.5% Bajjika, 0.2% Bhojpuri, 0.2% Yolmo and 0.2% other languages as their first language.

In terms of ethnicity/caste, 19.8% were Gurung, 15.2% Hill Brahmin, 11.6% Magar, 11.5% Chhetri, 7.8% Newar, 7.6% Sarki, 5.6% Kami, 4.8% Tamang, 3.0% Damai/Dholi, 3.0% Kumal, 2.5% Brahmu/Baramo, 1.9% Ghale, 1.3% Chepang/Praja, 1.1% Musalman, 1.0% Sanyasi/Dasnami, 0.8% Gharti/Bhujel, 0.3% Darai, 0.3% Thakuri, 0.2% Majhi, 0.1% Badi, 0.1% Gaine, 0.1% Rai, 0.1% Tharu and 0.2% others.

In terms of religion, 75.1% were Hindu, 19.1% Buddhist, 3.3% Christian, 1.1% Muslim, 0.6% Bon, 0.6% Prakriti and 0.1% others.

In terms of literacy, 66.1% could both read and write, 2.4% could read but not write and 31.4% could neither read nor write.

Health care

Following is the data obtained from the PHASE Nepal website:
Central/regional/zonal hospitals: 0
District hospitals: 2
Primary healthcare centres: 3
Health posts: 10
Sub-health post: 55
Number of doctors: 8
A district hospital is in Gorkha, the municipal hospital in Amppipal is supported by a German NGO.

The small health centers in many village development committees (VDCs) are without Auxiliary Health Workers (AHWs), Auxiliary Nurse Midwives (ANMs) and Community Health Workers (CHWs). So, people seeking emergency health assistance have to travel a long distance to the district headquarters or Kathmandu or end up dying because of lack of treatment. Many people still believe in Dhami and Jhakri and are against taking medicine or going to the hospital for the treatment. An NGO, PHASE Nepal provides many health care facilities and training programs to three VDCs: Sirdibas, Bihi/Prok and Chumchet. Many people residing in these VDCs have benefited from the program.

Educational status

As per the National Population and Housing Census of Nepal 2011, the literacy rate of Gorkha is 66.34%. The female literacy rate is 59.44% and the male literacy rate is 75.09%.

 Drabya Saha Multiple Campus, Gorkha Muniplicity-8, Laxmi Bazar
 Gorkha Campus, Gorkha Muniplicity, Gorkha
 Bhawani Multiple Campus, Palungtar, Gorkha
 Dullav Campus, Masel, Ghyampesal, Gorkha
 Paropakar Adarsha Multiple Campus, Jaubari, Gorkha  
 Bheemodaya Multiple Campus, Aarughat, Gorkha

Administration
The district consists of 11 Municipalities, out of which two are urban municipalities and nine are rural municipalities. These are as follows:
Gorkha Municipality
Palungtar Municipality
Sulikot Rural Municipality
Siranchowk Rural Municipality
Ajirkot Rural Municipality
Tsum Nubri Rural Municipality
Dharche Rural Municipality
Bhimsen Thapa Rural Municipality
Sahid Lakhan Rural Municipality
Aarughat Rural Municipality
Gandaki Rural Municipality

Former Village Development Committees 
Prior to the restructuring of the district, Gorkha District consisted of the following municipalities and Village development committees:

 Aanppipal
 Aaru Arbang
 Aaru Chanuate
 Aarupokhari
 Asrang
 Baguwa
 Bakrang
 Bhirkot
 Bhumlichok
 Bihi
 Borlang
 Barpak
 Bunkot
 Chhaikampar
 Chhoprak
 Chumchet
 Chyangli
 Darbhung
 Deurali
 Dhawa
 Dhuwakot
 Gaikhur
 Gakhu
 Ghairung
 Ghyachok
 Ghyalchok
 Gorakhkali
 Gorkha Municipality
 Gumda
 Hansapur
 Harmi
 Jaubari
 Kashigaun
 Kerabari
 Kerauja
 Kharibot
 Khoplang
 Laprak
 Lapu
 Lho
 Makaising
 Manakamana
 Manbu
 Masel
 Mirkot
 Muchhok
 Namjung
 Nareshwar
 Palungtar Municipality 
 Panchkhuwadeurali
 Pandrung
 Phinam
 Phujel
 Prok
 Ranishwara
 Samagaun
 Saurpani
 Srinathkot
 Simjung
 Sirdibas
 Swara
 Taklung
 Takukot
 Takumajhalakuribot
 Tandrang
 Tanglichok
 Taple
 Tara Nagar
 Thalajung
 Thumi
 Uiya
 Barpak

References

External links

 

 
Gandaki Province
Gurkhas
Districts of Nepal established during Rana regime or before